Loboptila is a moth genus of the family Depressariidae.

Species
 Loboptila cyphoma (Meyrick, 1915)
 Loboptila leurodes Turner, 1919

References

Depressariinae